Wendell Tre' Ming (born 11 April 1994), commonly known as Tre Ming, is a Bermudian professional footballer who currently plays for Bermudian Premier Division side PHC Zebras.

College career
Ming began his college career with South Kent in Connecticut, where he scored 8 goals in his junior year and set a South Kent record for assists in a season. While at the school, he received sponsorship money to go on trial with then-Premier League side Fulham, having spent time on trial with them and Portsmouth the previous year.

He enrolled at the Elmira College in 2012, and spent one year there, notching up 20 appearances and 4 goals. He was named Empire 8 Athletic Conference Rookie of the Year for his performances.

Ming then moved to the Thomas College, having received a scholarship from the Maine-based school, and helped the team win the 2013 North Atlantic Conference Championship in his first year. He spent the summer of 2014 with the IMG Academy in Bradenton, Florida, and played in the Premier Development League alongside fellow Bermudians Casey Castle, Drewonde Bascome and Jaylen Harvey.

He continued his good form over the next two years, amassing a total of 40 assists and 20 goals in 56 matches for the Terriers. He was named North Atlantic Conference Men's Soccer Player of the Year for 2015.

In October 2016, he was given a scholarship by the PHC Foundation to continue his studies at Thomas College.

Club career
Ming has balanced his college and club football his whole career; having started out with the PHC Zebras in 2010 while he was studying at South Kent School and was still with the Warwick-based side in 2011.

He joined the Bermuda Hogges in 2011 and was there until mid 2012. He scored one goal in nine games during his time with the Hogges.

By late 2012, Ming was back with the Zebras, where he stayed until early 2013 before heading back to America to continue his studies at the Thomas College.

He returned again in 2015 and throughout the next few seasons spent time in both Bermuda and the United States, continuing his studies in the latter.

In April 2017, he helped the Zebras win the Bermuda FA Cup for the first time in nine years. He captained the team and had to take time off from school to participate.

International career
Ming made his senior debut for Bermuda in 2013, playing 2 matches at the 2013 Island Games. He scored his first goal in a 2–1 win over French Guiana in March 2016.

Career statistics

International

International goals
Scores and results list Bermuda's goal tally first.

References

External links
 

1994 births
Living people
People from Hamilton Parish
Association football midfielders
Bermudian footballers
Bermuda international footballers
Bermuda Hogges F.C. players
PHC Zebras players
South Kent School alumni
2019 CONCACAF Gold Cup players
Thomas Terriers men's soccer players
Bermuda under-20 international footballers
Bermuda youth international footballers